The following is a list of characters that first appeared in the British soap opera EastEnders in 2022, by order of first appearance. All characters are introduced by the show's senior executive producer, Kate Oates, and executive producer, Jon Sen, or his successor, Chris Clenshaw. The first character to be introduced is Nina Gupta (Hersha Verity) in February, who was introduced as the new GP. Lewis Butler (Aidan O'Callaghan), a man that Kathy Beale (Gillian Taylforth) hires as the manager of her bar, was introduced in April, and Omar Lye-Fook debuted in July as Avery Baker, the brother of established character Mitch Baker (Roger Griffiths). He was followed by his sons, Finley (Ashley Byam) and Felix (Matthew James Morrison). Nina's stepson, Ravi Gulati (Aaron Thiara), was also introduced in July. Suki Panesar's (Balvinder Sopal) husband and the father of the Panesar children, Nish (Navin Chowdhry) made his debut in September. Additionally, multiple other characters have appeared throughout the year.

Nina Gupta

Nina Gupta, played by Hersha Verity, made her first appearance on 10 February and departed on 9 November. She is a doctor who tends to Kheerat Panesar (Jaz Deol) when he suffers food poisoning after eating a sandwich that he bought from Stacey's Baps. She reappears when Stacey Slater (Lacey Turner) brings her mother Jean (Gillian Wright) to a doctors appointment when she is convinced that Jean is having a manic episode. After Suki Panesar (Balvinder Sopal) buys a doctor's surgery, she hires Nina to run it alongside her daughter, Ash Panesar (Gurlaine Kaur Garcha).

Verity was keen to portray Nina since she liked her characterisation, specifically noting her "complete confidence, no fear of failure, goes after what she wants." Hinting at the future of her character, Verity told Digital Spy: "There is a lot more to her that is slowly starting to unfold. She has a few wants and goals of her own that go far beyond the surgery. So I am excited for that to unfold!" She was also intrigued by Nina's connection to the Panesar family. She opined that Ash is a great character due to being emotional and reactive while also being feisty and speaking her mind. Verity hoped that Nina would form a long-term friendship with Ash.

On being cast on the soap, she said: "There is nothing like this kind of experience, it's so iconic. Just a part of British culture, so it's exciting, but that can be quite nerve-wracking! When I was walking through the corridors and saw the pictures on the wall, I felt a real sense of history. It just felt like I was part of something very special. You are stepping into history. It is a really nice place to experience being an actor." Verity's father would not allow her to watch EastEnders as a child so she found it amusing to be cast on the soap. Walking onto the set for the first time was an exciting experience for her due to being early in her acting career; it led her to "just take a moment and [be] so grateful to have this experience".

Lewis Butler

Lewis Butler, played by Aidan O'Callaghan, made his first appearance on 11 April 2022. He was introduced as the new bar manager of the gay bar, the Prince Albert, after being hired by Kathy Beale (Gillian Taylforth). He chats up Callum Highway (Tony Clay), much to the annoyance of his husband Ben Mitchell (Max Bowden). The character and O'Callaghan's casting was announced on 6 April 2022 and it was confirmed that Lewis would appear in a storyline involving Callum and Ben, when he approves of Callum's new LGBTQ+ campaign at work despite Ben's objections. Lewis and Ben go on a night out, but Lewis is faced with homophobic abuse. On 23 April 2022, it was announced that Lewis would be involved in a male rape storyline in which the character rapes Ben. It was also revealed that EastEnders would be working with charities including Survivors UK, Survivors Manchester, and the Male Survivors Partnership to make sure that the storyline is covered as sensitively and accurately. It was confirmed on 17 August 2022 that O’Callaghan has left the soap with his final scenes airing that episode.

Avery Baker

Avery Baker, played by Omar Lye-Fook, made his first appearance on 4 July 2022. Avery is the estranged brother of Mitch Baker (Roger Griffiths) and will arrive with his sons Felix (Matthew James Morrison) and Finlay (Ashley Byam). Lye-Fook's casting and character were announced on 6 June 2022. Avery was described by Digital Spy's Justin Harp as having "a much different personality than his humble and caring brother". Avery is revealed to have a tense relationship with Mitch and Harp teased that it would potentially problems for him.

On joining EastEnders, Lye-Fook said: "I've been watching EastEnders since I was at school so it's such a surreal experience to now be part of the show". He also added: "I'm having so much fun and it's an honour to be working alongside this incredible cast". Executive producer Chris Clenshaw added: "The Baker Family bring a fresh, fierce, fun and exciting energy to the Square. Felix and Finlay are two very different firecrackers and, yes, these brothers fall out, take the mick and challenge each other, but none of that compares to their unswerving love and loyalty they have for one another. They may be charming young men, full of sass, swagger and strength but these brothers are Bakers and, like their father, Avery, have their own unique way of surviving. Omar, Matthew and Ashley all bring star quality to EastEnders and we’re excited to see them bring Avery, Felix and Finlay to life. The Baker family are the just the start of some new faces landing in Walford later this year – so watch this space…" Shortly after his introduction, his sons revealed to Mitch that Avery has terminal cancer; Metro confirmed that the storyline would result in his death.

Ravi Gulati

Ravi Gulati, played by Aaron Thiara, made his first appearance on 4 July 2022. Ravi was introduced as a cellmate of Phil Mitchell (Steve McFadden) and a former associate of Kheerat Panesar (Jaz Deol). Thiara's casting and character were also announced on the same day. Shaun Wren of Digital Spy, described the character as "charming and charismatic" and "ruthless and unpredictable", and show bosses have also teased that Ravi is "willing to do whatever it takes to get what he wants with no fear of the consequences". On his casting, Thiara said: "My heart is filled with immense gratitude to be joining such an iconic show, working alongside a stellar cast and a remarkable production team. It's a very proud moment for me and my family. This is a wondrous opportunity to approach as an actor, and I can't wait for people to meet Ravi on-screen and witness his roller-coaster of a journey!" Executive producer Chris Clenshaw also added: "Ravi is captivating, cunning and dangerous, and can go from pleasant to menacing with very little warning – unlike Aaron who’s a wonderful addition to the EastEnders cast. We’re all excited to see Aaron bring the character to life and there's plenty of drama and shocking twists in store – wherever Ravi goes, trouble follows".

Finlay Baker

Finlay Baker, played by Ashley Byam, made his first appearance in summer 2022. Finlay is the adopted son of Avery Baker (Omar Lye-Fook) and half-brother of Felix Baker (Matthew James Morrison). The character and Byam's casting was announced on 6 June 2022. On his casting on the soap, Byam said: "I'm very excited to be joining the Square. Like many people I grew up with EastEnders; it was almost like an unspoken family tradition. My mum and I sat there together watching so many incredible and iconic storylines. So to now be joining this classic British TV drama is an honour, and I'm truly grateful. I can't wait for everyone to meet Finlay and see what lies ahead for him". Of Finlay, Harp (Digital Spy) said that Finlay will "discover his charm will only get him so far in the square" and described Finlay and Felix as "brothers who always have each other's backs in difficult times  Executive producer Chris Clenshaw said of the family: "The Baker family bring a fresh, fierce, fun and exciting energy to the Square. Felix and Finlay are two very different firecrackers and, yes, these brothers fall out, take the mick and challenge each other, but none of that compares to their unswerving love and loyalty they have for one another. They may be charming young men, full of sass, swagger and strength but these brothers are Bakers and, like their father, Avery, have their own unique way of surviving. Omar, Matthew and Ashley all bring star quality to EastEnders and we're excited to see them bring Avery, Felix and Finlay to life. The Baker family are the just the start of some new faces landing in Walford later this year – so watch this space…"

Felix Baker

Felix Baker, played by Matthew James Morrison, made his first appearance in summer 2022. He is the son of Avery Baker (Omar Lye-Fook) and the half-brother of Finlay Baker (Ashley Byam). The character and Morrison's casting were announced on 6 June 2022. Felix is described as "quick with a witty retort" and will throw himself into life in Walford, but his quick-wit and frank honesty could get him into trouble. Of his relationship with his brother, the BBC said that "despite being the complete opposite of each other, Felix and Finlay present a united front and always have each other's backs". Executive producer Chris Clenshaw said of the family: "The Baker Family bring a fresh, fierce, fun and exciting energy to the Square. Felix and Finlay are two very different firecrackers and, yes, these brothers fall out, take the mick and challenge each other, but none of that compares to their unswerving love and loyalty they have for one another. They may be charming young men, full of sass, swagger and strength but these brothers are Bakers and, like their father, Avery, have their own unique way of surviving. Omar, Matthew and Ashley all bring star quality to EastEnders and we’re excited to see them bring Avery, Felix and Finlay to life. The Baker family are the just the start of some new faces landing in Walford later this year – so watch this space…" Of his casting, Morrison said, "It's an honour to be a part of such a legendary show that I grew up watching. It hasn't quite sunk in yet, and I don't think it ever will. I'm having a ball getting to grips with Felix and cannot wait for you all to meet him!"

In June 2022, during Pride Month, it was revealed by the BBC that Felix is a drag queen whose alias is "Tara Masu". Morrison felt privileged to showcase drag to EastEnders viewers, as well as representing the LGBTQIA+ community, and he felt that it is "important for people to feel reflected on screen". Morrison had not done drag prior to the role and received mentoring from drag queen Vinegar Strokes. The decision to write Felix as a drag queen received praise from Lucas Young, a drag queen who goes by the name of Ms Classpergers. They felt that it was a significant move from the soap and wished that they had that representation on-screen during their youth.

Nish Panesar

Nish Panesar, played by Navin Chowdhry, is the estranged husband of Suki Panesar (Balvinder Sopal) and the father of Kheerat (Jaz Deol), Jags (Amar Adatia), Vinny (Shiv Jalota) and Ash (Gurlaine Kaur Garcha). Chowdhry's casting as Nish was announced on 28 August 2022 and it was confirmed that he had already begun filming at the time. He arrives in Walford following a 20-year stretch in prison for murder. Prior to their time on EastEnders, Nish mentally abused and controlled Suki throughout their marriage. Nish arrives determined to repair his family relationships, including his marriage to Suki. Nish was described as a charming and charasmatic character, but they confirmed that viewers would quickly notice that he is "ice-cold, manipulative and driven by a need for power and respect".

On his casting, Chowdhry said that since he had never worked on a soap prior to EastEnders, the experience was all new for him. However, he loved the storylines given to him upon his debut. He particularly vented an interest in his onscreen family and liked that "there's so much happening at all times" in the Panesar unit. He found Nish to be an interesting and unconventional character, which he said would bring drama and mayhem". He opined that under his bad persona, there is a good man, but confirmed that Nish would cause "turmoil" for the Panesars. Executive producer Chris Clenshaw echoed Chowdhry's excitement the character, since Nish had been referenced numerous times prior to his arrival on the series. Clenshaw continued: "The spectre of Nish Panesar is finally here, and it's been a pleasure welcoming Navin to the cast, and take to the role so effortlessly. He brings something to the character that none of us could've predicted – his dynamic on and off-screen, and we're excited to see where his character develops as the story grows."

Reiss Colwell

Reiss Colwell, played by Jonny Freeman, is the great-nephew of Dot Cotton (June Brown) and a love interest for Sonia Fowler (Natalie Cassidy). He made his first appearance on the episode broadcast on 12 December 2022. Freeman's casting was announced on 22 November 2022. Of his casting, Freeman said, "I am delighted to be joining the cast of EastEnders, especially as part of the iconic Dot Branning's extended family. Everybody has been so welcoming and I'm very lucky to have been working so closely with the lovely Natalie Cassidy who is not only a fantastic actress but a delightful person; she has very kindly helped me navigate my first few weeks. I hope I can do Reiss justice. He is kind but socially awkward and seeing how he manages, or doesn't manage, his early exchanges with Sonia and her nearest and dearest has been quite interesting! I'm looking forward to seeing how both audiences and the residents of Walford respond to him."

Reiss arrives in Walford for Dot's funeral. He meets Dot's step-granddaughter, Sonia Fowler (Natalie Cassidy), and reveals that his family became estranged from Dot because of her marriage to Charlie Cotton (Christopher Hancock). He later has sex with Sonia after the wake.

Other characters

References 

EastEnders
2022
, EastEnders